Columbus Drive may refer to:

Columbus Drive (Chicago)
Columbus Drive (Tampa)